Bruno Junichi Suzuki Castanheira, commonly referred to as Bruno Suzuki (鈴木 ブルーノ) or Bruno Castanheira (born 20 May 1990), is a Brazilian footballer who plays for Malaysia Super League club PDRM.

Born in Brazil, Castanheira was raised in Japan, his maternal family country. He also holds Japanese citizenship.

Career

Beginnings in Japan and Singapore loan
Castanheira was sent out on loan to the Japan Football League club FC Machida Zelvia before returning and being sent out on loan again, this time with S.League club Albirex Niigata Singapore on loan from the parent club in Japan. He made his debut in the 26 July 2010 clash against Balestier Khalsa, in the 1–1 draw. He scored 3 goals in the 2011 Singapore League Cup including a double in the Quarter Final against Geylang United.

In 2012, Bruno returned to parent club, Albirex Niigata. He played a couple of matches during pre-season and was given the squad number 27. However, he found first team opportunities hard to come by, only being named on the substitute's bench once.

Singapore
He then signed with Albirex Niigata Singapore on a permanent basis for the 2013 S.League season upon expiration of his contract. The official announcement was made on 6 December 2012. Albirex Niigata Singapore finished second runner-up in the battle for second place, after a 3–1 defeat to Home United at Bishan Stadium during their last match day of the season, in which the White Swans needed a victory against the Protectors. He made 32 appearances and scored 7 goals in all competitions.

Castanheira signed in November 2013 with S.League rival Home United FC.  On 23 December 2014, Bruno signed with Geylang International in the upcoming 2015 S.League campaign, where he was reunited with former Albirex Niigata Singapore teammates Tatsuro Inui, Kento Fukuda, and Yuki Ichikawa.  On 4 October 2015, Castanheira scored a hat-trick against Courts Young Lions, ending Geylang International FC's nine-game winless streak.

He returned to Japan to play for the J2 League team FC Gifu in 2016.

Malaysia
Castanheira was signed by Negeri Sembilan FA, a club in Malaysia Premier League in 2017. After good performances in the season, during which he scored 11 league goals, he was transferred to rival club in the same league, Terengganu F.C. II in early 2018. Later in April the same year, he was brought to the Terengganu II's main team, Terengganu F.C. I on a short-term basis. He returned to Terengganu II after Terengganu I secured another import player in June 2018.

In 2021, Terengganu F.C. decided not to extend Castanheira's contract and release him. Castanheira was in negotiations with Chonburi F.C. in Thai League 1 but discussions were unsuccessful due to the COVID-19 situation in Thailand. Castanheira signed a one-year contract with Royal Malaysia Police F.C., continuing in the M league.

Club statistics
Updated to 1 November 2017.

Honours
Albirex Niigata Singapore
Singapore League Cup winner: 2011

References

External links
 
 Profile at FC Gifu
 
 Albirex Niigata Profile
  Bruno Castanheira signs for Albirex Niigata FC (S) on a permanent contract.

1990 births
Living people
Sportspeople from Paraná (state)
Brazilian expatriate sportspeople in Singapore
Brazilian people of Japanese descent
Brazilian footballers
Japanese footballers
Japanese expatriate footballers
J1 League players
J2 League players
Japan Football League players
Singapore Premier League players
Albirex Niigata players
FC Machida Zelvia players
FC Gifu players
Albirex Niigata Singapore FC players
Home United FC players
Geylang International FC players
Negeri Sembilan FA players
Brazilian emigrants to Japan
Brazilian expatriate footballers
Expatriate footballers in Singapore
Naturalized citizens of Japan
Association football forwards
People from Castanhal